Pelturagonia is a genus of lizards within the family Agamidae. The species are distributed in Sumatra and Borneo. All species were previously listed under the genus Phoxophrys.

Description
The genus Pelturagonia closely resembles the genus Japalura but differs in a number of characters, for example by the absence of a dorsal crest, and by having a relatively shorter and deeper head. Male Pelturagonia have a tail that is swollen basally and is flattened above, whereas females have a cylindrical tail.

Species
The  genus Pelturagonia contains the following five species which are recognized as being valid.

Pelturagonia anolophium 
Pelturagonia borneensis  - Sabah eyebrow lizard 
Pelturagonia cephalum  - Mocquard's eyebrow lizard
Pelturagonia nigrilabris  - Blacklipped eyebrow lizard
Pelturagonia spiniceps  - Sarawak eyebrow lizard

Nota bene: A binomial authority in parentheses indicates that the species was originally described in a genus other than Pelturagonia.

References

Pelturagonia
Reptiles of Southeast Asia
Lizard genera